The Open University of the Pamantasan ng Lungsod ng Maynila (PLM) or University of the City of Manila headquartered at the Gusaling Don Pepe Atienza at Intramuros, Manila, has operated a continuing education program for working adults and professionals in its partner institutions and agencies in and out of the country. It is designed to provide higher education and improved qualifications to individuals who are unable to take advantage of traditional modes of education because of personal and professional responsibilities. Open University offers undergraduate and postgraduate degree programs.

History 
The reorganization at the Pamantasan ng Lungsod ng Maynila (PLM) in 1997 paved the way for the establishment of the Division of Community Health Services (DCHS), which now serves as a component of the Open University. With the Integrated Midwifery Association of the Philippines (IMAP), it pioneered a program leading to the degree of Bachelor of Science in Community Health Service (BSCHS), a special program to qualified members and officers of IMAP that aims to upgrade their standards and quality of services. On April 16, 1998, PLM graduated its first batch of 87 midwives. Of these graduates, 39 were sponsored by Nestle Philippines.

Working with the Quality University Education for Social Transformation (QUEST), a non-government educational foundation, PLM and the Trinity University of Asia in Quezon City have already graduated more than 6,000 midwives nationwide.

Originally offering only the BCHS Program, the DCHS expanded its offerings to include the Master of Community Health Service (MCHS) in 2001. A year later, PLM by virtue of its charter, installed its General Education Curriculum (GEC) for the first two years of college education at the Second Philippine International School (SPIS), an all-Filipino educational institution for Overseas Filipino Workers in Riyadh, Kingdom of Saudi Arabia. This curriculum, permitted by the Kingdom of Saudi Arabia Ministry of Education, allows the student to pursue, in later years, courses in any discipline at PLM or in any institution for higher learning in the Philippines. Visiting assignments of PLM professors are part of the agreement between the partner schools.

In 2004, off-campus connections were established with Asia Pacific College of Advanced Studies, Southville International School and Colleges, and World CITI Colleges. In that same year, Mayor Feliciano Belmonte, Jr. of Quezon City signed a memorandum of agreement with the Open University that allows undergraduate city and barangay employees to get a college degree. To qualify, City Hall applicants should have served the local government for at least two years. Barangay employees, whether elected or appointed, must be at least high school graduates. Apart from city employees and officials, Quezon City residents are eligible to apply. Open to them are courses in business management and entrepreneurship.

At present, the distance learning programs and the off-campus program that offer a bachelor's degrees in public administration remains a continuing program. It is designed to help qualified government employees get their degrees and improve their competencies as a public servant.

Admissions 
Admission to the Open University is the responsibility of the partner school or agency. Students undergo either the screening procedure set by the partner agency or institution, or take the usual Graduate Record Examination (GRE) for on-campus admission at the PLM main campus.

Classes in the off-campus at the master's level programs are held on weekends in the host or partner institution. Provision for modular instructions are provided in various programs should the student decide to complete his tertiary education.

Part of the quality control that PLM imposes is the administration of a validation test in all subjects at the end of each semester. The results of this validation test shall form part of the grade a student receives in each subject.

Consortia 
Aside from partner schools, PLM is also engaged in partnership with companies, government agencies, organizations, and other institutions for the distance learning programs. These include:

 Association of Christian Educators of the Philippines
 ATS Technologies, Inc.
 Bicol Foundation for Higher Education
 Camps Caringal I & II
 Center for Reconstruction and Empowerment through Appropriate Technology and Education
 Central Police District in Quezon City
 Department of Budget and Management
 Department of the Interior and Local Government
 Department of Labor and Employment
 Fortune Guarantee and Insurance Corporation in Makati City
 Government Service Insurance System (GSIS)
 Laguna Lake Development Authority

 Light Rail Transit Authority (LRTA)
 Manila City Hall
 Manila Police District
 Manila Public Relations Bureau
 Mines and Geosciences Bureau
 National Museum
 National Press Club of the Philippines
 National Food Authority (NFA)
 Police Traffic Enforcement Group
 Philippine Ports Authority (PPA)
 Philtread Tire and Rubber Corporation
 Quezon City Hall
 St. Joseph's College (Quezon City)
 Four Chefs' Cuisine Inc.
 Uncle Cheffy System of Restaurants
 Perfect Fusion Inc.
 PsychServ Inc.
 Twin Fusion Inc.
 TCGI Engineers 
 Vinta Systems Inc.
 Philippine Psychological Corporation
 National Center for Mental Health

References

External links 
PLM Official University website
PLM Official Student Publication website
 Association of South East Asian Institutes of Learning
 Wikipedia Map

Pamantasan ng Lungsod ng Maynila
Distance education institutions based in the Philippines
Local colleges and universities in Manila